Charles Cyphers (born July 28, 1939) is an American–Manx actor who is known in the horror movie community for his work in the films of John Carpenter, especially his role as Sheriff Leigh Brackett in Carpenter's 1978 movie Halloween. He reprised this role in the 1981 sequel Halloween II and the 2021 sequel Halloween Kills.

Film work

Cyphers's first feature film was the 1974 movie Truck Turner, and he first worked with Carpenter in the 1976 action film Assault on Precinct 13, in which he played Starker, one of the ill-fated police officers gunned down by gang members.

He later appeared as Sheriff Leigh Brackett in the 1978 hit horror movie Halloween. Cyphers worked with Carpenter two years later, playing Dan O'Bannon in The Fog, a 1980 horror film which also starred Tom Atkins, Cyphers's fellow Halloween cast member Jamie Lee Curtis, his Assault on Precinct 13 co-star Darwin Joston, and Nancy Kyes, who worked with Cyphers in both Assault on Precinct 13 and Halloween.  He then played the Secretary of State in Carpenter's popular 1981 film Escape from New York, in which he appeared with Atkins and Halloween actress Nancy Stephens. He reprised the role of Sheriff Brackett in Halloween II. 

In 2005, he appeared in the movie Dead Calling, and in 2007 he was set to appear in Ethan Dettenmaier's unreleased film, Sin-Jin Smyth, and in the film Methodic in a role which paid homage to his character in Halloween.

He reprised the role of Sheriff Leigh Brackett in the 2021 film Halloween Kills.

Television
Cyphers has appeared in numerous television productions. During the 1970s, he had a recurring role, as Hugo Muncy, in The Betty White Show, and he guest-starred in an episode of Gibbsville in 1976. In addition, he had guest roles in popular television series such as Barnaby Jones, Wonder Woman and The Dukes of Hazzard, and he played Drake in the 1977 mini series  Roots.

More recently, he has appeared in Sliders, ER, Seinfeld, JAG, and Any Day Now. From 1996 to 1998, Cyphers played Al Yaroker in the 1990s series Nick Freno: Licensed Teacher. He has also acted in various made-for-television movies.

Other work
Cyphers' roles on the stage, both on- and off-Broadway, include 12 Angry Men, in which he portrayed "Juror #3" to Julie Cobb's "#2" (her father portrayed "#3" in the 1957 movie).
Cyphers appeared on The Dating Game in 1967 to compete for a date with Yvonne Craig ("Batgirl" from the 1960s Batman TV series).

Filmography

Cool Breeze (1972) as Backstage Police Officer (uncredited)
The Slams (1973) as Nicol - Prison Guard (uncredited)
Truck Turner (1974) as Drunk
Vigilante Force (1976) as Perry Beal
Assault on Precinct 13 (1976) as Special Officer Starker
MacArthur (1977) as Brigadier General Forest Harding
Coming Home (1978) as 'Pee Wee'
Gray Lady Down (1978) as Larson
Halloween (1978) as Sheriff Leigh Brackett
Someone's Watching Me! (1978) as Gary Hunt
Elvis (1979) as Sam Phillips
A Force of One (1979) as Dr. Eppis
The Onion Field (1979) as Chaplain
Borderline (1980) as 'Ski'
The Fog (1980) as Dan O'Bannon
Escape from New York (1981) as US Secretary of State York
Halloween II (1981) as Sheriff Leigh Brackett
Death Wish II (1982) as Donald Kay
Honkytonk Man (1982) as Stubbs
Grizzly II: The Predator (1983) as Steve
Hunter's Blood (1986) as Woody 
Big Bad Mama II (1987) as Stark
Gleaming the Cube (1989) as Harvey McGill
Major League (1989) as Charlie Donovan
Loaded Weapon 1 (1993) as Interrogator
Murder in the First (1995) as Bailif (uncredited)
Mach 2 (2001) as Harry Olson
Critical Mass (2001) as Henderson
Dead Calling (2006) as Chuck Walker
Sin-Jin Smyth (2006) (unreleased)
 Methodic (2007) as Chief Sperranza
Halloween Kills (2021) as Leigh Brackett

References

External links

1939 births
American male film actors
American male television actors
Living people
Male actors from New York (state)
People from Niagara Falls, New York
20th-century American male actors
21st-century American male actors
20th-century Manx male actors
21st-century Manx male actors
American expatriate male actors in the United Kingdom